Thomas Cobham (died 1327) was an English churchman, who was Archbishop-elect of Canterbury in 1313 and later Bishop of Worcester from 1317 to 1327.

Cobham earned a Doctor of Theology and a Doctor of Canon Law and served as Archdeacon of Lewes from 1301 to around 1305. Cobham was nominated to replace Archbishop Robert Winchelsey in 1313, by the monks of Christ Church Priory, Canterbury. The election took place on 28 May 1313. King Edward II intervened and petitioned the pope to appoint the Bishop of Worcester – Walter Reynolds to Canterbury instead of Cobham. Pope Clement V acquiesced and issued a bull dismissing the election of Cobham on 1 October 1313 and installing Reynolds in his stead.

On 31 March 1317, Cobham was provided to the bishopric of Worcester, and was consecrated on 22 May 1317.

Cobham died on 27 August 1327. His library was given to the University of Oxford.

He may have been Chancellor of the University of Cambridge, but there is confusion with another similarly named person who was also Chancellor in the 15th century.

Citations

References
 British History Online Archdeacons of Lewes accessed on September 11, 2007
 British History Online Bishops of Worcester accessed on September 11, 2007
 
 Weir, Alison Queen Isabella: Treachery, Adultery and Murder in Medieval England New York: Ballantine 2005 
 British History Online: The University of Cambridge: Chancellors accessed on February 17, 2023

Archbishops of Canterbury
1327 deaths
Bishops of Worcester
Archdeacons of Lewes
14th-century English Roman Catholic archbishops
Burials at Worcester Cathedral
Year of birth unknown
14th-century English clergy